Kawaguchi (written: 川口 literally means "river mouth") is a Japanese surname. Notable people with the surname include:

 Debra Kawaguchi (1991-2003), 13-year-old American suicide victim featured in the Piers Anthony novel Air Apparent
 Ekai Kawaguchi (1866-1945) Japanese Buddhist monk, and the first recorded Japanese person to travel in Nepal and Tibet
 Hiroshi Kawaguchi (composer) (born 1965), Japanese composer most known for his works with Sega
 Junnosuke Kawaguchi (born 1961), Japanese bassist who played for bands such as The Blue Hearts
 Kaiji Kawaguchi (born 1948), Japanese manga author
 Keiichiro Kawaguchi, Japanese animation director
 Masafumi Kawaguchi (born 1973), American football player from Japan
 Matsutarō Kawaguchi (1899-1985), Japanese author, playwright, and movie producer
 Kiyotake Kawaguchi (1892-1961), Japanese general during World War II 
 Senri Kawaguchi (born 1997), Japanese drummer, see :ja:川口千里_(ドラマー)
 Takao Kawaguchi (born 1950), Olympic gold medalist in judo
 Yoichiro Kawaguchi (born 1952), Japanese computer graphics artist and professor at the University of Tokyo
 Yoriko Kawaguchi (born 1941), Japanese politician 
 Yoshikatsu Kawaguchi (born 1975), Japanese soccer player
 Yuko Kawaguchi (1981), Russian (Japanese origin) pairs figure skater
 , Japanese ice hockey player

Japanese-language surnames